Allday (born Tom Gaynor, 1991) is an Australian rapper.

Allday may also refer to:
 David Allday (born 1964), former Australian rules footballer
 Peter Allday (1927–2018), British hammer thrower
 Steve Allday (born 1957), equine veterinarian
 Suzanne Allday (born 1934), British hammer thrower and discus thrower, wife of Peter

See also
 All Day (disambiguation)
 Alday (surname)